Acquavella may refer to:

 Acquavella (surname), a surname
 Acquavella Galleries, New York gallery